Murat Akyüz (born 13 August 1981) is a Turkish former football player who played as a fullback.

Career
On 6 January 2016, he was released by Elazığspor and joined Adana Demirspor on 9 January 2016 on a two-year contract. On 14 June 2016, he terminated his contract and became a free agent.

On 31 August 2016, he joined Bucaspor on a one-year contract.

References

External links
 
 

1981 births
People from Bakırköy
Footballers from Istanbul
Living people
Turkish footballers
Association football defenders
Kartalspor footballers
Kayseri Erciyesspor footballers
Ankaraspor footballers
Denizlispor footballers
Karşıyaka S.K. footballers
Elazığspor footballers
Samsunspor footballers
Adana Demirspor footballers
Bucaspor footballers
Vefa S.K. footballers
Süper Lig players
TFF First League players
TFF Second League players